Pliomelaena is a genus of tephritid or fruit flies in the family Tephritidae.

Species
Pliomelaena assimilis (Shiraki, 1968)
Pliomelaena biseta Wang, 1996
Pliomelaena brevifrons (Bezzi, 1918)
Pliomelaena caeca Bezzi, 1924
Pliomelaena callista (Hering, 1941)
Pliomelaena discosa Munro, 1947
Pliomelaena exilis Munro, 1947
Pliomelaena joanetta Munro, 1947
Pliomelaena luzonica Hardy, 1974
Pliomelaena parviguttata Hering, 1952
Pliomelaena quadrimaculata Agarwal & Kapoor, 1989
Pliomelaena sauteri (Enderlein, 1911)
Pliomelaena shirozui Ito, 1984
Pliomelaena sonani (Shiraki, 1933)
Pliomelaena stevensoni Munro, 1937
Pliomelaena translucida Hering, 1942
Pliomelaena udhampurensis Agarwal & Kapoor, 1988
Pliomelaena zonogastra (Bezzi, 1913)

References

Tephritinae
Tephritidae genera
Diptera of Asia
Diptera of Africa